Ultimate Collection is a compilation album by Joe Cocker, released in 2004 (see 2004 in music).

Track listing
"With a Little Help from My Friends" - 5:12
"Feelin' Alright" - 4:12
"Delta Lady" - 2:51
"She Came in Through the Bathroom Window" - 2:37
"The Letter" (live) - 4:17
"Cry Me a River" (live) - 3:57
"You Are So Beautiful" - 2:43
"I'm So Glad I'm Standing Here Today" - 5:00 (with The Crusaders)
"Sweet Little Woman" - 4:01
"Many Rivers to Cross" - 3:43
"Up Where We Belong" - 3:52 (with Jennifer Warnes)
"Shelter Me" - 4:21
"You Can Leave Your Hat On" - 4:13
"Unchain My Heart" - 5:06
"When the Night Comes" - 3:57
"Now That the Magic Has Gone" - 4:38
"Summer in the City" - 3:52
"Have a Little Faith in Me" - 4:39
"Sail Away" - 3:00
"First We Take Manhattan" - 3:40

References

Joe Cocker compilation albums
2004 compilation albums